How to Marry a Millionaire is a 1953 American screwball comedy film directed by Jean Negulesco and written and produced by Nunnally Johnson. The screenplay was based on the plays The Greeks Had a Word for It (1930) by Zoe Akins and Loco (1946) by Dale Eunson and Katherine Albert.

It stars Betty Grable, Marilyn Monroe, and Lauren Bacall as three fashionable Manhattan models, along with William Powell, David Wayne, Rory Calhoun, and Cameron Mitchell as their wealthy marks. Although Grable received top billing in the screen credits, Monroe's name was listed first in all advertising, including the trailer.

Produced and distributed by 20th Century Fox, How to Marry a Millionaire was the studio's first film to be shot in the new CinemaScope wide-screen sound process, although it was the second CinemaScope film released by Fox after the biblical epic film The Robe (also 1953). It was also the first color and CinemaScope film ever shown on prime-time network television (though panned-and-scanned) when it was presented as the first film on NBC's Saturday Night at the Movies on September 23, 1961.

The soundtrack to How to Marry a Millionaire was released on CD by Film Score Monthly on March 15, 2001.

Plot

Resourceful Schatze Page, spunky Loco Dempsey, and ditzy Pola Debevoise are money-hungry gold diggers. The trio rent a luxurious Sutton Place penthouse in New York City from Freddie Denmark, who is avoiding the IRS by living in Europe. The women plan to use the apartment to attract rich men. And on the day they move in, Loco carries in groceries, assisted by Tom Brookman, who is attracted to Schatze. She dismisses him as being poor and sets her sights on the charming, classy, rich widower J.D. Hanley. While she is stalking the older J.D., Tom pursues her. After every date, she says she never wants to see Tom again, refusing to marry another "gas pump jockey".

Meanwhile, Loco meets grumpy businessman, Walter Brewster. He is married, but she agrees to go with him to his lodge in Maine, thinking it is a convention of the Elks Club. Loco discovers her mistake and attempts to leave. However, she comes down with the measles and is quarantined. Upon recovering, she begins seeing forest ranger, Eben Salem. She mistakenly believes Salem is a wealthy landowner instead of a civil servant overseeing acres of forestlands. She is disappointed when she realizes the truth, but loves him anyway and is willing to overlook his financial shortcomings.

Pola is myopic but hates wearing glasses in the presence of men. She falls for a phony oil tycoon, J. Stewart Merrill, unaware he is a crooked speculator. When she takes a plane from LaGuardia Airport to meet him, she ends up on the wrong plane. A man sits next to her, also wearing glasses. He thinks she is "quite a strudel" and encourages her to wear hers. He is the mysterious Freddie Denmark on his way to Kansas City to find the crooked accountant who got him into trouble with the IRS. He has little luck when he tracks the man down, but he and Pola fall in love and get married.

Loco and Pola are reunited with Schatze just before her wedding to J.D.. Schatze is unable to go through with the marriage and confesses to J.D. that she loves Tom. He agrees to call off the ceremony. Tom is among the wedding guests and the two reconcile and marry. Afterwards, the three happy couples end up at a greasy spoon diner. Schatze jokingly asks Eben and Freddie about their financial prospects, which are slim. When she finally gets around to Tom, he casually admits a net worth of around $200 million, which no one takes seriously. He then calls for the check, pulls out an enormous wad of money, and pays with a $1,000 bill, telling the chef to keep the change. The three astonished women faint, and the men drink a toast to their unconscious wives.

Cast
 Marilyn Monroe as Pola Debevoise
 Betty Grable as Loco Dempsey
 Lauren Bacall as Schatze Page
 William Powell as J. D. Hanley
 David Wayne as Freddie Denmark
 Rory Calhoun as Eben Salem
 Cameron Mitchell as Tom Brookman
 Alex D'Arcy as J. Stewart Merrill
 Fred Clark as Waldo Brewster

Production
Nunnally Johnson, who adapted the screenplay from two different plays, produced the picture.

20th Century Fox started production on The Robe before it began How to Marry a Millionaire. Although the latter was completed first, the studio chose to present The Robe as its first CinemaScope picture in late September or early October 1953 because it felt the family-friendly The Robe would attract a larger audience to its new widescreen process.

The film's cinematography was by Joseph MacDonald. The costume design was by Travilla.

Portrayal of New York
Between scenes, the cinematography has some iconic color views of mid-20th century New York City: Rockefeller Center, Central Park, the United Nations Building, and Brooklyn Bridge in the opening sequence following the credits. Other iconic views include the Empire State Building, the lights of Times Square at night and the George Washington Bridge.

Music

A song extolling the virtues of New York follows the Gershwin-like music used for the title credits, after an elaborate five-minute pre-credit sequence showcasing a 70-piece orchestra conducted by Alfred Newman before the curtain goes up.

The score for How To Marry a Millionaire was one of the first recorded for film in stereo. It was composed and directed by Alfred Newman, with incidental music by Cyril Mockridge, and orchestrated by Edward B. Powell. The album was released on CD by Film Score Monthly on March 15, 2001 as part of their series Golden Age Classics.

The film's theatrical version begins with a nearly six-minute overture of Newman's symphonic piece "Street Scene", which he wrote in the style of George Gershwin. It is played on-screen by an 80-piece studio orchestra (billed as "The Twentieth Century Fox Symphony Orchestra"). Newman wrote the piece for the 1931 film of the same name, which featured his first complete film score.

Release and box office
The film premiered at the Fox Wilshire Theatre (now the Saban Theatre), in Beverly Hills, California on November 4, 1953. It was a box office success, earning $8 million worldwide and $7.5 million domestically, second that year only to The Robe. It was the fourth highest-grossing film of 1953, whereas Monroe's previous feature, Gentlemen Prefer Blondes, was seventh.

Award nominations

Television adaptation
In 1957, the film was adapted into a sitcom also titled How to Marry a Millionaire. It starred Barbara Eden (as Loco Jones), Merry Anders (Michelle "Mike" Page), Lori Nelson (Greta Lindquist) and as Nelson's later replacement, Lisa Gaye as Gwen Kirby. It aired in syndication for two seasons.

Remake
In 2000, 20th Century Fox Television produced a made-for-TV remake, How to Marry a Billionaire: A Christmas Tale. It reversed the sex roles, and had three men looking to marry wealthy females. It starred John Stamos, Joshua Malina and Shemar Moore.

In 2007, Nicole Kidman bought the rights to How to Marry a Millionaire under her production company Blossom Films, intending to produce and possibly star in a remake.

References

Bibliography

External links

 
 
 
 
 
 Listing of CD and LP releases of music from the film, including "Street Scene"

1953 films
1953 romantic comedy films
1950s American films
1950s buddy comedy films
1950s English-language films
1950s female buddy films
20th Century Fox films
American buddy comedy films
American female buddy films
American films based on plays
American romantic comedy films
CinemaScope films
Films about weddings in the United States
Films adapted into television shows
Films based on multiple works
Films directed by Jean Negulesco
Films scored by Cyril J. Mockridge
Films set in Maine
Films set in New York City
Films shot in Idaho
Films shot in Los Angeles
Films shot in New York City
Films with screenplays by Nunnally Johnson